The International Graduate School of English is an educational institution in Seoul, South Korea.

There are two departments:  English Language Teaching  and ELT Materials Development.  Both offer master's degrees. All regularly enrolled students in this school receive a tuition waiver.  The school has a number of affiliated facilities, including its Teacher Training Institute, IGSE  Library, IGSE Press, ELT Information Database, and ELT Research Institute.  CELTA courses are also taught at the school.  English is the medium of communication on the IGSE campus.

References

Universities and colleges in Seoul
Educational institutions established in 2002
2002 establishments in South Korea